Bears were once common in Ireland but are now extinct on the island, having died out in the 1st millennium BC.

History

A subspecies of the brown bear (Ursus arctos) evolved in and was native to ancient Ireland, probably living much as bears do today - as  carrion-scavenging grazers who hibernate in the colder months. However, much like today's bears, the ancient Irish brown bear likely would supplement their broad diet with young and adult red deer, wild boar, Irish hare and Atlantic salmon (in addition to a myriad of other marine and freshwater species). The bulk of a bear's diet consists of wild berries, fruits, fallen nuts, edible flowers, grasses and herbs.

Bears in Ireland often slept through the cold winter in caves, hollows, burrows or sheltered cliffsides; several are known to have died during hibernation, with their bones being found by modern-day archaeologists. The most famous fossils were discovered in Poll na mBéar (lit. "bear's hole") in gContae Liatroma (County Leitrim) and Uaimh na hAille (Aillwee Cave) in gContae an Chláir (County Clare). Remains have also been found at Lough Gur; County Kildare; and County Longford. Perforated bear teeth (worn on necklaces) have been found in caves in County Clare.

A bear patella bearing butchery marks has been dated to 10860–10641 BC; it was found in the Alice and Gwendoline Cave, County Clare and is the earliest known evidence of human activity in Ireland.

DNA studies have shown that the Irish bear was intermediate between the modern brown bear and modern polar bear. This suggests that the Irish bear interbred with archaic polar bears during the Pleistocene.

The bear is believed to have died out c. 1000–500 BC, due to habitat loss and hunting.

Terminology

In Old Irish, there are three words used for bear:
art, from Proto-Celtic *artos and Proto-Indo-European *h₂ŕ̥tḱos; related to Greek ἄρκτος (arktos).
math, from Proto-Celtic *matus, as in the Gaulish names Matugenos, Matuus, Teutomatus.
beithir; its meaning "bear" is borrowed from the Germanic (Norse bera, English bear); it is believed to derive from a Proto-Celtic *betrix which referred to a monster or beast (as in Latin bēstia).

The word art fell out of use, with the word gamuin ("calf") being added to math to create mathgamain, and the word beithir being respelled as béar.

Personal names

The elements art and math often appear in personal names like Arthur or surnames such as MacMahon. In the 12th century Mathghamhain mac Conchobar Maenmaige Ua Conchobair was a prince of Connacht; Mathghamhain Maonmhaighe Ó Briain was King of Thomond in the 15th century; and Mathghamhain Ó hIfearnáin was a poet of the 16th century.

Art mac Cuinn, Art Imlech and Art mac Lugdach were legendary High Kings of Ireland; King Arthur's name is believed to be Brythonic for "bear-man"; and Art Óg mac Murchadha Caomhánach was a 14th-century king. The name Artrí ("bear-king") is also recorded; Artrí mac Cathail was King of Munster in the 8th–9th centuries, and Artrí mac Conchobair was briefly Abbot of Armagh in the 9th century. The surname O'Hart also derives from Ua hAirt, "descendant of Art"; they were based around the Hill of Tara before losing their land in the Norman invasion and resettling in County Sligo.

Legend and myth
Bears occasionally appear in Irish mythology and folk tales, for example, in the tale of The Brown Bear of Norway.

Toponyms

Bears died out in Ireland prior to the coming of the Celts, so their name does not appear in very many place names. The Beara Peninsula, Bear barony and Bere Island are not named for the mammal; the name is believed to have the same root as Iberia. Lismaha (Irish Lios Matha), a townland in County Roscommon, possibly means "bear ringfort", although it could also be "Matthew's ringfort."

Captive bears and reintroduction

Bear-baiting took place in Ireland in the early modern period, with it being common in Belfast; a baiting in Dublin in 1726 led to a bull and bear escaping, with one bear "[seizing] one man by the leg and tore it to pieces." A bear-baiting took place in Cork in 1769.

Two polar bears lived in Dublin Zoo between the early 1980s and 2003. The female bear's behaviors caused concerns and an independent study was commissioned which found bears needed to be able to spend time alone when they choose. It was later moved to a zoo in Hungary where their needs can be accommodated better.

Habitat loss has made it impossible to reintroduce the bear to Ireland, but there are two brown bears — rescued from a private zoo in Lithuania — residing in Wild Ireland, a  reserve on the Inishowen Peninsula.

See also
 List of extinct animals of the British Isles
 Wolves in Ireland

References

External links

Extinct animals of Ireland
Quaternary bears
Ireland
Mammals of Europe